Silver Lake is an alpine lake in Blaine County, Idaho, United States, located in the Boulder Mountains in Sawtooth National Recreation Area. While no trails lead to the lake, it is most easily accessed from the end of forest road 174. The lake is located southwest of Silver Peak and southeast of Peak 11,240.

References

Lakes of Idaho
Lakes of Blaine County, Idaho
Glacial lakes of the United States
Glacial lakes of the Sawtooth National Forest